Ma Huan (c. 1380–1460), courtesy name Zongdao, pen name Mountain-woodcutter (會稽山樵), was a Chinese voyager and translator who accompanied Admiral Zheng He on three of his seven expeditions to the Western Oceans. Ma was a Muslim and was born in Zhejiang's Kuaiji Commandery, an area within the modern borders of Shaoxing. He knew several Classical Chinese and Buddhist texts. He learned Arabic to be able to translate.

Expeditions and writings 
In his fourth expedition in 1413, he visited Champa, Java, Sumatra, Palembang, Siam, Kochi and Hormuz.

In the 1421 expedition, he visited Malacca, Aru, Sumatra, Trincomalee, Ceylon, Kochi, Calicut, Zufar and Hormuz.

In the 1431 expedition, he visited Bengal, Chittagong, Sonargaon, Gaur and Calicut. From Calicut, he was sent by Eunuch Hong Bao as emissary to Mecca.

During his expeditions, Ma Huan took notes on the geography, politics, weather conditions, environment, economy, local customs, and even methods of punishment for criminals. Returning home on his first expedition, he began writing a book on his expedition, the first draft of which was ready around 1416. He expanded and modified his draft during later expeditions, the final version was finalized around 1451. The title of his book was Yingya Shenglan (The Overall Survey of the Ocean's Shores).

During the Ming dynasty and Qing dynasty, there were many printed and handcopied editions. The latest authentic text of a printed version was edited and annotated by historian . A newer edition, based on Ming dynasty handcopied editions, was recently published by Ocean Publishing House in China.

An annotated English translation by J.V.G. Mills (1887–1987) was published by the Hakluyt Society in 1970, and reprinted in 1997 by The White Lotus Press in Bangkok. Mills's translation was based on the edition by Feng Cheng jun.

The Yingya Shenglan is considered by sinologists worldwide as a primary source for the history of Ming dynasty naval exploration, history of South East Asia and history of India.

Some scholars who have done research work on Ma Huan are J.J.L. Duyvendak, F. Hirth, Paul Pelliot, Feng Chengjun, Xiang Da, J.V.G. Mills.

See also 
 Fei Xin, another participants of Zheng He's expeditions who wrote a book
 The "Mao Kun map" in Wubei Zhi

References

Citations

Sources 

 Ying-yai Sheng-lan, The Overall Survey of the Ocean's Shores 1433 by Ma Huan, translated by J.V.G. Mills, with foreword and preface, Hakluyt Society, London 1970; reprinted by the White Lotus Press 1997. 
 Paul Pelliot, Les grands voyages maritimes chinois au début du 15ème siècle.
 The Oxford Encyclopedia of Maritime History. Oxford Reference.

Further reading
 Gordon, Stewart. When Asia was the World: Traveling Merchants, Scholars, Warriors, and Monks who created the "Riches of the East" Da Capo Press, Perseus Books, 2008. .

14th-century Chinese people
15th-century Chinese people
15th-century Chinese translators
15th-century writers
1380 births
1460 deaths
Year of birth uncertain
Chinese explorers
Explorers of Asia
Chinese Muslims
Hui people
History of Kerala
Chinese travel writers
Ming dynasty translators
Writers from Shaoxing
Treasure voyages
Explorers of India